USS Twiggs (DD-591), a Fletcher-class destroyer, was the second ship of the United States Navy to be named for Marine Major Levi Twiggs (1793–1847).

Twiggs was laid down on 20 January 1943 at the Charleston Navy Yard; launched on 7 April 1943; sponsored by Mrs. Roland S. Morris; and commissioned on 4 November 1943. She was sunk on 16 June 1945 by a kamikaze aircraft near Okinawa.

History
Following a shakedown cruise to Bermuda in December 1943, Twiggs operated out of Norfolk as a training ship until 12 May 1944, when she departed Hampton Roads in company with Franklin (CV-13), Cushing (DD-797), and Richard P. Leary (DD-664) and proceeded, via the Panama Canal and San Diego, to Hawaii.

After arriving in Pearl Harbor on 6 June 1944, Twiggs took part in exercises and drills in Hawaiian waters and escorted convoys operating between Oahu and Eniwetok. Throughout most of July, Twiggs worked out of Eniwetok alternating exercises with escort and radar picket duties. On 19 August, she returned to Pearl Harbor to begin rehearsals for the long-awaited return to the Philippines.

On 15 September, in preparation for the assault on Leyte, Twiggs departed Pearl Harbor as a member of Destroyer Squadron 49 (DesRon 49), screening Task Group 79.2 (TG 79.2), Transport Attack Group "Baker", which steamed via Eniwetok for Manus in the Admiralty Islands. After final preparations for the impending invasion, she departed Seeadler Harbor on 14 October. Arriving off Leyte on 20 October, Twiggs helped to provide antiaircraft protection for the transports during the landings. In the following days of heavy enemy air activity, she continued to support the invasion and, on one occasion, rescued a downed flier from Petrof Bay (CVE-80). Twiggs departed Leyte on 25 October, steamed via Mios Woendi Island to Manus, and arrived at Seeadler Harbor on 1 November.

Twiggs next rendezvoused with Haraden (DD-585) and Halligan (DD-584) for escort duty among the Palau Islands. Stationed east of Mindanao, she protected convoys on the approaches to Leyte.

On 10 December, Twiggs left Kossol Roads, between Peleliu and Angaur, with a task force bound for the occupation of Mindoro Island. Luzon was the key to the liberation of the Philippines, and Mindoro was the first step in the assault on Luzon. From 13 December through the 17th, Twiggs provided antiaircraft cover for the force as it steamed through Surigao Strait and the Mindoro Sea.

Late in 1944, Japan began organized and concerted use of kamikazes. On 13 December, a Japanese suicide plane crashed into Haraden (DD-585). Twiggs aided the severely damaged destroyer, fighting fires and treating casualties. She was then detached from the convoy to guide Haraden, which had lost communications and radar in the engagement, until the battered vessel made visual contact with a tow convoy off Silino Island. Twiggs then returned to the Mindanao Sea and resumed her duties with the task unit. Army Air Force flights out of Leyte augmented escort protection of the convoy. Twiggs retired to the Palaus on 20 December.

Twiggs sortied from Kossol Roads on 1 January 1945 protecting a large task force intended for the invasion of Luzon. In the Sulu and South China Seas, several ships of the convoy were hit by Japanese plane attacks; and, on 4 January 1945, Twiggs rescued 211 survivors of Ommaney Bay (CVE-79), destroyed by fire and explosion following an attack by a suicide plane. Raids by both torpedo and kamikaze planes continued as Twiggs operated northwest of Cape Bolinao in support of the Lingayen assault. After taking on food and ammunition at Mindoro, Twiggs briefly ran antisubmarine patrol off the entrance of Manganin Bay. Underway on the 21st, she arrived in Ulithi on 25 January for minor repairs and maintenance in preparation for the conquest of the Volcano Islands.

Iwo Jima
Twiggs joined the Bombardment Group which sortied from Ulithi on 10 February for rehearsals at Loesip Island. On 16 February, the force arrived off Iwo Jima where Twiggs quickly began fire support for pre-assault underwater demolition operations off the eastern beaches. She also conducted screening and harassing activities, firing on Japanese shore units and providing illumination. On the 17th, a suicide plane attack on Twiggs resulted in a close call when the plane, in an obvious attempt to crash into the destroyer, crossed her fantail before hitting the water off her port beam and sinking without exploding. The destroyer continued activities to support American ground forces during the grueling battle for Iwo Jima. On 10 March, she retired toward the Carolines, arriving at Ulithi two days later for rest and replenishment.

Okinawa
On 25 March 1945, as part of Task Force 54 (TF 54), Twiggs arrived off Okinawa to take part in the preinvasion bombardment. In addition to antisubmarine and antiaircraft patrols, she supported ground forces with night harassing fire. Kamikaze aircraft were very active at this time, as the Japanese desperately defended the island. On the 28th of April, a day of heavy air activity, a kamikaze splashed close aboard Twiggs while she was on radar picket duty with Task Group 51. Bomb blast and fragmentation from the splashed airplane blew in the hull plating between the main and first platform deck causing structural damage. The underwater body was dished in, and the starboard propeller was bent. Nestor (ARB-6) repaired the damage; and, on 17 May, Twiggs returned to duty with the gunfire and covering forces off Okinawa.

In June, the battle for Okinawa was drawing to its close. Twiggs continued radar picket duties in the western fire support area and supported strikes on Iheya Shima and Iheya-Aguni with pre-landing bombardment and gunfire support. On 16 June, Twiggs was on radar picket duty off Senaga Shima in the western fire support area. At 20:30, a single, low-flying plane dropped a torpedo which hit Twiggs on her port side, exploding her number 2 magazine. The plane then circled Back and completed its kamikaze mission in a suicide crash, the explosion enveloped the destroyer in flame; and, within an hour, she had sank. Despite the hazard of exploding ammunition from the blazing Twiggs, 188 survivors were rescued from the oily waters. Among the 126 dead and missing was her commanding officer, Comdr. George Philip Jr.  was nearby at the time of the attack. Captain Glenn R. Hartwig, the squadron commander in Putnam, quickly closed with Twiggs. Exploding ammunition made rescue operations hazardous, but of 188 Twiggs survivors snatched from the sea, Putnam accounted for 114.

Twiggs was struck from the Navy list on 11 July 1945; and, in 1957, her hulk was donated to the government of the Ryukyu Islands.

Twiggs received four battle stars for World War II service.

See also
See USS Twiggs for other ships of the same name.

References 

Brown, David. Warship Losses of World War Two. Arms and Armour, London, Great Britain, 1990. .

External links 

        navsource.org: USS Twiggs
  hazegray.org: USS Twiggs

World War II destroyers of the United States
Ships built in Charleston, South Carolina
1943 ships
Fletcher-class destroyers of the United States Navy
Ships sunk by kamikaze attack
Maritime incidents in June 1945
Destroyers sunk by aircraft